Axel Erik Heinrichs (21 July 1890 – 16 November 1965) was a Finnish military general. He was Finland's Chief of the General Staff during the Interim Peace and Continuation War (1940–1941 and 1942–1944) and commander-in-chief for a short time after the war (1945).

Biography
Heinrichs went to the Swedish co-educational school Nya svenska samskolan. He was one of the Finnish Jaeger troops trained in the volunteer Royal Prussian 27th Jäger Battalion between 1915 and 1918. During the Finnish Civil War he served as a battalion commander in the battles of Tampere and Viipuri. He commanded the III Corps in the Winter War, and from 19 February 1940 the Army of the Isthmus. He was made Chief of the General Staff in June 1940 and promoted to General of Infantry in 1941.

During the Continuation War he commanded the Army of Karelia until January 1942, after which he was again appointed the Chief of the General Staff. After the war he served as the Army's commander-in-chief but was forced to resign because of the Weapons Cache Case. In 1944 Heinrichs became the second person to receive the Mannerheim Cross, First Class. He was also a recipient of the Knight's Cross of the Iron Cross.

Heinrichs was one of the military experts of the delegation sent by president Paasikivi to Moscow for the Agreement of Friendship, Cooperation, and Mutual Assistance in 1948.

Heinrichs was also a praised author of which his book on Gustaf Mannerheim is considered his best. He was made an honorary doctor at University of Helsinki.

References

Literature

 
 Tapola, Päivi: Kenraalien kirjeet, Tammi, 2007. .
 Mann, Chris & Christer Jorgensen: Hitler’s Arctic War: The German Campaigns in Norway, Finland and the U.S.S.R. 1940–1945. 2002. 

1890 births
1965 deaths
Military personnel from Helsinki
People from Uusimaa Province (Grand Duchy of Finland)
Swedish-speaking Finns
Finnish generals
German Army  personnel of World War I
People of the Finnish Civil War (White side)
Finnish military personnel of World War II
Knights of the Mannerheim Cross
Recipients of the Knight's Cross of the Iron Cross
Chiefs of Staff (Finnish Defence Forces)
Jägers of the Jäger Movement